Andreas Keravnos (born 5 May 1999) is a Cypriot footballer who plays as a goalkeeper for cypriot club Anorthosis.

Club career

Anorthosis Famagusta
On 22 August 2022, Keravnos signed with Cypriot First Division club Anorthosis on a three-year contract until 2025.

References

External links

1999 births
Living people
Cypriot footballers
AEL Limassol players
AEZ Zakakiou players
Cypriot First Division players
Cypriot Second Division players
Association football goalkeepers
Sportspeople from Limassol